Surgiya (Kaitag: Сургьей) is a rural locality (a selo) in Dzhirabachinsky Selsoviet, Kaytagsky District, Republic of Dagestan, Russia. The population was 182 as of 2010. There are 2 streets.

Geography 
Karatsan is located 17 km southwest of Madzhalis (the district's administrative centre) by road. Dzhirabachi and Daknisa are the nearest rural localities.

Nationalities 
Dargins live there.

References 

Rural localities in Kaytagsky District